Ultra Korea is an outdoor electronic music festival that is a part of Ultra Music Festival's worldwide expansion, which has now spread to twenty countries. Following Ultra Brasil's third edition in 2011, Ultra Korea made its debut as a two-day festival in August 2012 and took place at the Olympic Stadium in Seoul, Korea. The most recent edition of Ultra Korea took place during 8–10 June 2018 at Seoul's Olympic Stadium. Ultra Korea is strictly a festival for those ages 19 and over. The next edition of Ultra Korea will take place during 7–9 June 2019 at the Olympic Stadium in Seoul.

History

2012 
The debut of Ultra Korea took place during 3–4 August 2012 at the Olympic Stadium in Seoul, Korea and featured three stages—Main Stage, Live Stage, and the Carl Cox & Friends Arena. This is the second Ultra Worldwide festival to ever host an Ultra Live Stage, following Miami. The first edition of Ultra Korea welcomed approximately 60,000 people in attendance and included the likes of Skrillex, Steve Aoki, Sidney Samson, J Symposium, Twelvetones, Marc Vedo, Elio Riso, Afrobeta, Tiesto, Team H, Chuckie, Sander Kleinenberg, The Crystal Method, Carl Cox, John Digweed, Yousef, and many more to Seoul's Olympic Stadium.

2013 
Ultra Korea returned to the Olympic Stadium in Seoul, Korea during 14–15 June 2013 for its second edition and featured the same three stages from the year before—Main Stage, Live Stage, and the Carl Cox & Friends Arena. This edition of Ultra Korea included Armin van Buuren, Kaskade, Afrojack, Krewella, Tommy Trash, Carl Cox, Adam Beyer, Nicole Moudaber, RioTGeaR, Moriarty, Roger Shah, DJ Junior, Avicii, Fedde Le Grand, Sander van Doorn, Cazzette, Victor Calderone, and many more.

2014 

In 2014, Ultra Korea once again returned to the Olympic Stadium in Seoul, Korea during 13–14 June, for its third edition. Two new stages were added to Ultra Korea 2014—the Mega Outdoor Stage and the Underground Stage, which replaced the Carl Cox & Friends Arena. Ultra Korea's third edition featured the likes of Above & Beyond, Steve Aoki, Laidback Luke, Nervo, Sick Individuals, Empire of the Sun, the Bloody Beetroots (live), Heatbeat, Morgan Page, Steve Angello, Paul van Dyk, W&W, Blasterjaxx, Infected Mushroom, M.I.A., Far East Movement, Nic Fanciulli, Sasha, and many more.

2015 

2015 marked Ultra Korea's fourth event and was held at Seoul's Olympic Stadium once again and took place during 12–13 June 2015. This edition replaced the Mega Outdoor Stage with a new stage entitled the Magic Beach Stage. Artists on the bill for Ultra Korea 2015 were Hardwell, Skrillex, Nicky Romero, DVBBS, Justin Oh, Porter Robinson, 2ManyDJs, Kennedy Jones, Los de La Vega, Protoculture, David Guetta, Alesso, Knife Party, Galantis, Snoop Dogg, Lil Jon, Nic Fanciulli, Pirupa, and many more. Ultra Korea drew 110,000 fans from all over to the Olympic Stadium in 2015.

2016 
The fifth edition of Ultra Korea has expanded to three days and took place during 10–12 June 2016 at the Olympic Stadium in Seoul, Korea. The fifth edition consisted of four stages—Main Stage, Live Stage, Underground Stage, and the Magic Beach Stage. Artists on the bill for Ultra Korea's fifth edition included Afrojack, Avicii, Armin van Buuren, Axwell & Ingrosso, Chase and Status (live), deadmau5, Knife Party, Martin Garrix, Heatbeat, Eelke Kleijn, Rabbit in the Moon, Fedde Le Grand, Jauz, Netsky (live), Sunnery James & Ryan Marciano, Justin Oh, and many more. Ultra Korea drew in a record-breaking 150,000+ strong crowd, for what was officially the largest electronic music festival ever to take place on Korean soil.

2017 
To celebrate Ultra Korea returning in 2017 to Seoul, a special private sale took place on 23 August 2016 and the allotted tickets were sold out within that day. Tickets continued to go on and off sale throughout the remainder of the year. On 1 February 2017, the official dates for Ultra Korea's 6th edition were announced (10–11 June 2017). The event will run simultaneously with Ultra Singapore, making it the second time Ultra Worldwide held a number of events on the same day, and the first 2-day festival to do so. The phase one lineup for Ultra Korea 2017 was announced 10 March 2017 and includes Axwell ^ Ingrosso, Dash Berlin, Don Diablo, Dubfire, KSHMR (live), Nic Fanciulli, Nicky Romero, Sasha & John Digweed, Sam Feldt, SHRKTOPS, Steve Aoki, and Tchami (live). The phase 2 lineup was announced on April 28, 2017.

2018 
For the seventh edition of Ultra Korea, the festival is returning to a three-day event, taking place on 8–10 June 2018. Phase 1 lineup of Ultra Korea was released on 4 April 2018 and included Above & Beyond, Axwell & Ingrosso, The Chainsmokers, David Guetta, Galantis, Nicky Romero, Steve Angello, Zedd and Zhu.

2019 
For the eighth edition of Ultra Korea, the festival is returning to a three-day event, taking place on 7–9 June 2019. The lineup includes Martin Garrix, Skrillex, Virtual Self and Jamie Jones as main artists.

Martin Garrix, and Swedish House Mafia on each day they were supposed to perform of the event, cancelled due to various reasons. Martin Garrix and Swedish House Mafia were originally slated as headliners. Refunds were issued in the amount of 1/3 of the tickets purchased.

See also 
 List of electronic dance music festivals
 Ultra Music Festival
 Russell Faibisch
 Ultra Brasil
 Ultra Japan
 Ultra Chile
 Ultra Buenos Aires
 Ultra Singapore
 Road to Ultra
 Ultra South Africa
 Ultra Europe
 Ultra Bali

References

External links 
 Ultra Worldwide
 Ultra Korea
 Ultra Music Festival

Electronic music festivals in South Korea
Summer events in South Korea